Warren Love (born February 3, 1950) is an American politician who served as a member of the Missouri House of Representatives for the 125th district from 2013 to 2017. He is a member of the Republican Party. On August 30, 2017, Love made a controversial statement on Facebook, stating that those who vandalized a Confederate statue be "hung from a tall tree with a long rope".

References

Living people
Republican Party members of the Missouri House of Representatives
1950 births
21st-century American politicians
People from Osceola, Missouri